Daniel Aaron Strauss (born April 12, 1986) is an American politician who serves on the Seattle City Council from District 6. A native of Seattle's Ballard neighborhood, he previously worked as an aide to local politicians, including Seattle councilmember Sally Bagshaw.

Early life and career

Strauss was born in the Ballard neighborhood of Seattle to a Jewish family of social workers and graduated from Nathan Hale High School. He participated in the Northwest Youth Corps and local search and rescue groups in high school and the National Civilian Community Corps in college. Strauss graduated with a degree in political science from Whittier College, where he was elected student body president, and a Master of Public Administration from the University of Oregon in 2012. As a graduate student, he also worked as a policy intern for Oregon state representative Nancy Nathanson.

After graduating from college, Strauss returned to Seattle and worked as an aide to several local politicians. He was part of the campaign team for Snohomish County councilman Dave Somers during his 2013 reelection. He then worked as a legislative assistant for State Senator David Frockt. Strauss worked for the Alliance for Gun Responsibility during their successful campaign on Initiative 1491, which expanded gun safety protections. From 2017 to 2019, he served as a legislative assistant to Seattle councilmember Sally Bagshaw.

Political career

Strauss announced his candidacy for the District 6 seat in February 2019, shortly before incumbent councilmember Mike O'Brien announced that he would not seek re-election. He finished first out of 13 candidates in the primary election, with 34 percent of the vote, and advanced to the general election alongside former city councilmember Heidi Wills. Strauss was endorsed by the King County Labor Council and The Stranger, while Wills earned the support of the Seattle Metropolitan Chamber of Commerce and Amazon. He won 55.65 percent of the vote and was sworn in on December 22, 2019, at a ceremony at the Ballard Centennial Bell Tower.

Strauss is the chair of the Land Use and Neighborhoods Committee.

Electoral history

2019 election

References

Living people
Politicians from Seattle
Seattle City Council members
Jewish American people in Washington (state) politics
Whittier College alumni
University of Oregon alumni
21st-century American politicians
1986 births
21st-century American Jews